Quadricoccus australiensis is a gram-negative, oxidase-negative, catalase-positive, aerobic, non-motile bacterium from the genus of Quadricoccus which was isolated from activated sludge biomass sample in Australia.

References

Rhodocyclaceae
Bacteria described in 2002